Dichrometra palmata is a species of echinoderms belonging to the family Mariametridae.

It is native to Indian Ocean and Malesia.

References

Mariametridae
Animals described in 1841